Paramontroseite (V4+O2) is a relatively rare orthorhombic vanadium oxide mineral in the Ramsdellite group. Synthetic paramontroseite may have applications in medicine, batteries and electronics.

Name

The name Paramontroseite  is derived from the Greek παρα (para), meaning near, and montroseite, a related mineral.
The name was chosen due to the mineral's paramorphic relationship to the host mineral montroseite.
Montroseite is named after Montrose County, Colorado, USA, where it was first found.
Names in other languages include Paramontroseit (German), Paramontroseita (Spanish), Парамонтрозеит (Russian) and 副黑钒矿 副黑铁钒矿 (Chinese).
Synonyms are Inorganic Crystal Structure Database (ICSD) 22303 and Powder Diffraction File (PDF) 25-1003.

Occurrence

Paramontroseite is associated with montroseite and corvusite.
It  is found in relatively unoxidized Colorado Plateau-type uranium–vanadium ores in sandstones.
The type locality is Bitter Creek Mine, Paradox Valley, Uravan District, Montrose County, Colorado, USA.
In the USA it is found in Montrose County, Colorado, San Miguel County, Colorado, Mesa County, Colorado, Emery County, Utah, Apache County, Arizona, McKinley County, New Mexico and Fall River County, South Dakota.
It has also been reported from locations in the Czech Republic, Mendoza Province, Argentina and the Mounana uranium mine near Franceville, Gabon.

Paramontrosite has also been found in an outcrop on the Van Irvine Ranch in the Pumpkin Buttes area of Wyoming, USA, associated with sulfides in red sandstone.
It is found in a zone where the sandstone changes color from red to gray.
The black paramontroseite cements grains of sand into nodular masses that enclose smaller pyrite masses.
Vanadium salts have given a greenish coating to the exposed surfaces of these masses.
The masses are anomalously radioactive and the surrounding sandstone is weakly radioactive.
The radioactivity is mostly caused by tiny specks of coffinite in the paramontroseite.
When a section is polished the paramontroseite completely fills the gaps between the grains of sand.
It is very soft and has a gray color that is slightly lighter than quartz gray.
There is strong anisotrophism and many bright multi-colored internal reflections.

Deposits of montroseite (V,Fe)OOH and paramontroseite VO2 have been found in the Saltwash Sandstone Member of the Upper Jurassic Morrison Formation in the Colorado Plateau.
From the diffraction characteristics of the paramontroseite there seem to be two distinct generations: a primary paramontroseite with good crystalline structure and a product of montroseite oxidation with poor crystalline structure.
The paramontroseite found in this region is among the neutral minerals in the mid-range of vanadium valence (+4) above the primary ore of montroseite (+3) but below minerals such as carnotite (+5) and pascoite (+5).

Lifecycle

Paramontroseite is a metastable form of vanadium dioxide (VO2) that results from oxidation of montroseite.
It is formed by dehydrogenation of montroseite.
Paramontroseite seems to be the most common initial product of oxidation of montroseite.
The primary difference between the crystal structures of the two minerals is that the oxygen–oxygen distance increases from 2.63Å in montroseite to 3.87Å in paramontroseite due to the loss of hydrogen in the latter.
The vanadium–oxygen distances are also somewhat shorter in paramontroseite than in montroseite, as would be expected when the vanadium is oxidized from +3 to +4 when the hydrogen is removed.

The montroseite, VO(OH), is deposited in crystalline masses in a sandstone matrix by some unknown process.
Usually iron occurs in place of some of the vanadium.
Oxygen in the air or groundwater then oxidizes the crystallised montroseite at temperatures under 50 °C through the reaction:
2VO(OH) + O2 → 2VO2 + H2O
During the solid state alteration process the hydrogen atoms migrate through the crystal structure to the surface, where they combine with oxygen.
In the process there is a slight shift in the crystal structure, but the structure remains intact.
The vanadium-oxygen bonds have not been broken and the hexagonal close-packed oxygen framework has not been disrupted.
In some cases there may be an intermediate "diffuse A" phase.
The process by which montroseite is altered to paramontroseite seems analogous to the magnetite → maghemite, lepidocrocite → maghemite, and goethite → hematite processes.

Paramontroseite is not stable and is destroyed by weathering, replaced by minerals of the corvusite type.
The paramontroseite reacts under neutral or acid conditions to form many compounds such as vanadyl vanadate and metal vanadates such as hewettite, hummerite, pascoite and rossite.
Paramontroseite may dissolve in slightly alkaline conditions, then combine with Ca++ to form simplotite:
4VO2 + 2OH− + Ca++ → CaV4O9 + H2O

Possible applications

Autophagy is a process of cellular degradation that is essential in preserving homeostasis of cells.
It is often thought that when autophagosomes encapsulate and trap inorganic nanoparticles they may be unable to degrade them and the cell's well-being may be threatened.
However, experiments have shown that nanocrystals of paramontroseite induce cyto-protective autophagy in cultured HeLa cells.
It is possible that this may have value in therapies.

Montroseite and paramontroseite microspheres have been synthesized by hydrothermal carbonization of sucrose and calcinated to form V2O3-VO2-C core-shell microspheres.
These have been used experimentally as cathode materials for a lithium-ion battery.
Y. Xu and colleagues of the University of Science and Technology of China have shown that synthetic montroseite VOOH hollow structures can convert topochemically to paramontroseite without altering the size and appearance of the structures.
Both forms appears to have potential in lithium ion batteries as anode materials.

Monoclinic vanadium dioxide VO2(M) is potentially of great value for applications such as intelligent temperature sensors and smart windows.
The classic solid state transformation from vanadium precursors to rutile VO2(R) is slow and costly.
A transformation from goethite VOOH to synthetic "paramontroseite" VO2 to the desired monoclinic VO2(M) promises to greatly reduce cost and time.

Classification

Paramontroseite was first described before 1959.
It is a member of the Ramsdellite Group.
It is classified as follows:
Strunz 8th edition: 4/F.08-30.
Nickel-Strunz 10th edition: 4.DB.15a
Dana 8th edition: 4.4.11.1
Hey's CIM Reference: 7.12.3

Properties

Physical 
Physical properties of Paramontroseite include
{|
|Empirical formula ||  V4+O2
|-
|Chemical formula || VO2
|-
|Molecular mass || 82.94 gm (61.42% vanadium and 38.58% oxygen by weight).
|-
|Hardness || soft 
|-
|Fracture || brittle
|-
|Cleavage || good 
|-
|Density (g/cm3) || 4 (measured), 4.095 (calculated)
|-
|Calculated electron density || 3.85 gm/cc
|-
|Calculated fermion index || 0.0017206735
|-
|Calculated boson index || 0.9982793265
|-
|Radioactive || no
|}

Chemistry

The X-ray powder diffraction pattern for a Bitter Creek mine sample is 3.39 (100), 2.645 (50), 4.35 (35), 2.213 (35), 1.426 (35), 2.479 (25), 2.179 (25).
In this sample the chemistry was:
{|
|style="width:4em;"| V2O4||style="text-align:right;"| 72.5
|-
| V2O3 ||style="text-align:right;"| 10.5
|-
| FeO ||style="text-align:right;"| 8.8 
|-
| H2O ||style="text-align:right;"| 5.0
|}
A sample from Matchless mine, Colorado, USA had chemistry:
{|
|style="width:4em;"| V2O4 ||style="text-align:right;"| 66.9
|-
| SiO2 ||style="text-align:right;"| 6.12
|-
| Al2O3 ||style="text-align:right;"| 3.00
|-
| V2O3 ||style="text-align:right;"| 11.10
|-
| FeO ||style="text-align:right;"| 8.26
|-
| H2O ||style="text-align:right;"| 4.82
|}
The measured chemistry of a microprobe fragment in the gray phase by the RRUFF project gave metals in the ratio: 
V4+ (82%), Fe3+ (9%), U6+ (4%) and Al (2%), with one metal atom per two oxygen atoms.
The lightest phase was uranophane.

Optical 
Paramontroseite is opaque and black to grayish black in color.
Its optical class is biaxial.
It has a sub-metallic luster and a black streak.
From the Gladstone–Dale relation (KC = 0.393), the NCalc is 2.61 where Ncalc=Dcalc*KC+1, or 2.57 where Ncalc=Dmeas*KC+1.

Crystallography

Paramontroseite crystal properties include:
{|
|style="width:16em;"| Crystal structure || orthorhombic - dipyramidal 
|-
|Cell dimensions || a = 4.905Å, b = 9.422Å, c = 2.916Å, Z = 4; V = 134.76 Den (Calc) = 4.09.
|-
|Ratio:a:b:c || 0.5205:1:0.3094.
|-
|Point group || 2/m 2/m 2/m.
|-
|Space group || Pbnm
|-
|Space group number || 62.
|-
|X-Ray diffraction by intensity (I/Io) || 3.39(1), 2.649(0.5), 4.35(0.35).
|}

Endmatter

Notes

Citations

Sources

Vanadium minerals
Orthorhombic minerals
Minerals in space group 62
Oxide minerals